Charles Russell Severance is an American computer scientist and academic who currently serves as Clinical Associate Professor of Information at the University of Michigan, he runs https://www.wa4e.com/.

Severance studied at Michigan State University, gaining his BS in 1984, his MS in 1990, and his PhD in 1996, all in computer science. After graduation, he became an Adjunct Assistant Professor at Michigan State, also serving as Director of the Division of Engineering Computer Services. He left this role in 1999 to become associate director for Advanced Technology at the University of Michigan's Media Union, and left the institution entirely in 2001 to serve as Director of Product Development for Strategic Interactive. In August 2002, he returned to the University of Michigan as the first Chief Architect of the Sakai Project, later becoming a member of the Sakai Foundation Board of Directors, and then its first executive director.

In 2007, he resigned from his position as the executive director of the Sakai Foundation, becoming Clinical Associate Professor of Information at the University of Michigan. In 2012, he was hired by Blackboard Inc. to lead their initiatives involving Sakai projects. He announced his departure from this role in March 2014. Outside of teaching and the private sector, Severance helped write the POSIX P1003 standard and has hosted several television shows, including Nothin but Net and Internet:TCI.

Books

References

External links
 
 
 

Living people
University of Michigan faculty
American computer scientists
Michigan State University alumni
Year of birth missing (living people)